The electoral district of Mordialloc is an electorate of the Victorian Legislative Assembly including the suburbs of Braeside, Mordialloc, Aspendale, Aspendale Gardens, Edithvale, Chelsea, Chelsea Heights and Parkdale; and parts of Cheltenham and Mentone. The current member is Tim Richardson.

Mordialloc is part of the Melbourne Sandbelt and is considered a Bellwether electorate. Its previous members include Liberal representatives Lorraine Wreford and Geoff Leigh, and Labor member Janice Munt.

Members

Election results

References

External links
 Mordialloc district page at the Victorian Electoral Commission site

1992 establishments in Australia
Electoral districts of Victoria (Australia)
City of Kingston (Victoria)
City of Greater Dandenong
Electoral districts and divisions of Greater Melbourne